The Lancer 40 is an American sailboat that was designed by Herb David as a motorsailer and cruiser and first built in 1983.

Production
The design was built by Lancer Yachts in the United States, between 1983 and 1985, but it is now out of production.

Design
The Lancer 40 is a recreational keelboat, built predominantly of fiberglass, with wood trim. It has a masthead sloop rig, a center cockpit, a raked stem, an angled transom, with a fixed swimming platform, a skeg-mounted rudder controlled by a wheel and a fixed fin keel. It displaces  and carries  of ballast.

See also
List of sailing boat types

References

External links
Photo of a Lancer 40 showing the bow
Photo of a Lancer 40 showing the transom

Keelboats
Motorsailers
1980s sailboat type designs
Sailing yachts
Sailboat type designs by Herb David
Sailboat types built by Lancer Yachts